Soraya Toppin-Herbert (born 7 January 1994) is a Barbadian footballer who plays as a midfielder for the Barbados women's national team. She currently serves as the Director of Women’s Football for the Bahamas Football Association.

Early life
Toppin-Herbert was raised in Saint James. She has attended the Queen's College in Barbados and the Philadelphia-Montgomery Christian Academy in the United States.

College career
Toppin-Herbert has attended the Purdue University in the United States.

Club career
Toppin-Herbert has played for UWI Blackbirds in Barbados.

International career
Toppin-Herbert capped for Barbados at senior level during two CONCACAF W Championship qualifications (2010 and 2022) and the 2020 CONCACAF Women's Olympic Qualifying Championship qualification.

Administrative career
In December 2021, she was named Director of Women's Football with the Bahamas Football Association.

References

External links

1994 births
Living people
People from Saint James, Barbados
Sportspeople from Bridgetown
Barbadian women's footballers
Women's association football midfielders
Queen's College (Barbados) alumni
Purdue Boilermakers women's soccer players
UWI Blackbirds FC players
Barbados women's international footballers
Barbadian expatriate footballers
Barbadian expatriate sportspeople in the United States
Expatriate women's soccer players in the United States